The 2018 National Camogie League, known for sponsorship reasons as the Littlewoods Ireland Camogie Leagues, commenced in January 2018 and was won by Kilkenny.

Format

League structure
The 2018 National Camogie League consists of three divisions: eleven teams in Division 1, thirteen teams in Division 2 and four in Division 3; Divisions 1 and 2 are divided into two groups. Each team plays every other team in its group once. 3 points are awarded for a win and 1 for a draw.

If two teams are level on points, the tie-break is:
 winners of the head-to-head game are ranked ahead
 if the head-to-head match was a draw, ranking is determined by the points difference (i.e. total scored minus total conceded in all games)
 if the points difference is equal, ranking is determined by the total scored

If three or more teams are level on league points, rankings are determined solely by points difference.

Finals, promotion and relegation
The top two teams in each group in Division 1 contest the National Camogie League semi-finals. The last-placed team in each group contest the relegation playoff.

The top two teams in each group in Division 2 contest the Division 2 semi-finals. The last-placed team in each group contest the relegation playoff.

All four teams in Division 3 contest the Division 3 semi-finals.

Fixtures and results

Division 1

Group 1

Group 2

Finals

Division 2

Finals

Division 3

Finals

References

League
National Camogie League seasons